Aero Continente Dominicana was short-lived airline based in Santo Domingo, Dominican Republic, operating out of Las Américas International Airport on behalf of Aero Continente from Peru, its parent company.

History
Aero Continente decided to establish a wholly owned subsidiary in Santo Domingo in 2001. Over the following months, a limited number of scheduled flights to Miami were offered. In August 2003, the aircraft was returned to Aero Continente, which marked the end of the Dominicana subsidiary.

Destinations
Dominican Republic
Santo Domingo - Las Américas International Airport Hub
United States
Miami - Miami International Airport

Fleet
Aero Continente Dominicana owned a single Boeing 737-200 by May 2002.

See also
List of defunct airlines of the Dominican Republic

References

Defunct airlines of the Dominican Republic
Airlines established in 2001
Airlines disestablished in 2003